Brittany Chikyra Barber (born April 3, 1991) is an American singer and songwriter from Compton, California. She released two mixtapes throughout 2016: AfterHours, and HelloSummer. Her EP Urban Nostalgia debuted #168 on the R&B iTunes Top 200 charts in 2018. She has collaborated with numerous artists including Queen Naija, Chrisette Michele, John Legend, YG, Kash Doll, Tyla Yaweh, Eric Bellinger and Ledisi. She has writing credits that include Theophilus London's "Can't Stop" featuring Kanye West, Ledisi's "Let Love Rule" and Atlantic Records artist Bhad Bhabie. She is also known as one of the youngest African American female A&Rs to have worked at Warner Music Group. Barber features in Season 6 of Love and Hip Hop: Hollywood as a recurring cast member and Season 10 of Love & Hip Hop Atlanta.

Early life
Brittany B. was born and raised in Compton, California, United States. She has two younger brothers. She attended Centennial High School and played basketball began singing at a young age in church choir which sparked her interest in becoming a singer.

Early career
Brittany got her start singing background vocals at local venues in Hollywood, Ca. She then met Terrace Martin who took notice of her budding talent. She worked on Terraces' Locke High 2 album lending her vocals to such songs as, " Love" ft Ty Dolla Sign, " Lithium" ft Punch, and " We just keep it hood". She then began receiving local recognition in Los Angeles.

Spirit Music Group & Touring

In 2014 Brittany signed a publishing deal with Spirit Music Group after writing her first major song. " Can't Stop" by Theophilus London Ft. Kanye West. From then Brittany worked with many major producers, hit songwriters and artists. She began touring with Chrisette Michele for her " Lyricist Opus" tour and also featured on the hit reality show, R&B Divas LA". In 2016 she began working with Ledisi and John legend on their albums and in studio collaborations with some of the hottest producers in the game.Bhad Bhabie & Solo CareerOn February 14, 2016, Brittany B. released her mixtape AfterHours. She signed to Empire Records in March 2016. Brittany released her EP HelloSummer on July 4, 2016 under the Empire label. Due to the success of her solo EP's Brittany decided to begin working on her album. During this time she received film and TV syncs on hit shows such as FX's Atlanta and TV One's " Bad Dad Rehab" film. She continued writing and received a call from an executive at Warner Music Group to begin working on viral sensation Bhad Bhabie. Brittany co-wrote her first single, "These Heaux" which debuted #77 on the Billboard Hot 100 charts, making Bhad Bhabie the youngest female rap artist in history to chart Billboard Hot 100.Love & Hip Hop Hollywood Brittany B. starred in Season 6 of Love & Hip Hop Hollywood as well as Season 10 of Love & Hip Hop Atlanta. The season primarily focused on her career, her rivalry with Lyrica Anderson and other cast mates as well as her tense relationship with her estranged drug addicted mother. She also had an iconic line " You said it was on sight" which went viral online. Music SupervisionIn 2022 Brittany B. became a Music Supervior for AMC/ALLBLK's show " A La Carte" Season 1 and Season 2. Brittany scored and comprised the music for this Series which did well with the network earning a Season 2 renewal. Ghetto Feng Shui & Grammy Win'In 2022 Brittany B. changed her artist moniker to Bee-B and signed a deal with OneRpm. She released her album " Ghetto Feng Shui" in November 2022 which charted #100 on the R&B itunes charts. 
In 2023 She became a Grammy Winner in the category of " Best R&B Album" for her writing contributions on Robert Glaspers Black Radio III album. This makes her 2nd Grammy Nomination and 1st win of her career.

Selected discography

 " Out of My Hands" Robert Glasper ft. Jennifer Hudson 
  " Shine" Elaine 
 “ I’m Her” - Queen Naija ft Kiana Lede 
 "No Lames" – Kash Doll ft. Summer Walker 
 "Headline" – Eric Bellinger ft. Kehlani 
 "Let Love Rule" – Ledisi 
 "Give You More" – Ledisi Ft. John Legend
 "Spaz" – Bhad Bhabie ft YBN Nahmir
 "Adderall" – Tyla Yaweh 
 "Wraith Skating" – Tyla Yaweh ft. PNB Rock 
 "Mama Don't Worry (Still Ain't Dirty)" – Bhad Bhabie
 "I Got It" – Bhad Bhabie 
 "Whachu Know" – Bhad Bhabie 
 "These Heaux" – Bhad Bhabie 
 "Bad Chick" –  Fx's Atlanta'' TV Show 2016
 "OMT" – Brave Williams of R&B Divas LA in Bad Dad Rehab TV ONE Film  2016
 "Shadow Of A Doubt" – Freddie Gibbs 2015
 "Who Knows" & "Whatcha Think About" – Jovanie  2015
 "Sex You" – Lyrica Anderson 2015 ft. Wiz Khalifa
 "Make Us One" – Chrisette Michelle
 "Can't Stop" – Theophilus London ft. Kanye West 2014
 "Just Another Holiday" – 2013 Ravaughn Brown
 "Last Love" – 2012 Problem Diamond Lane Music Group
Source:

References

 https://www.grammy.com/grammys/videos/whos-nominated-best-rb-album-60th-grammy-awards
 https://www.billboard.com/.../cash-me-outside-girl-danielle-bregolis-new-song-stream
 https://www.hotnewhiphop.com/danielle-bregoli-aka-bhad-babies-these-heaux-lands-on-the-billboard-100-news.37236.html
 https://www.hotnewhiphop.com/bhad-babie-drops-hi-bich-whachu-know-in-her-new-video-new-video.42697.html
 https://web.archive.org/web/20171222053048/http://www.spiritmusicgroup.com/Clients/Library/Brittany-Barber

External links 

 
 

Living people
1991 births
African-American women singer-songwriters
Singer-songwriters from California
21st-century American women singers
21st-century African-American women singers
20th-century African-American people
20th-century African-American women